Pamilacan is an island barangay in the Philippines, situated  south of Bohol island and surrounded by the Bohol Sea (also called Mindanao Sea). It is one of the of 17 barangays that compose the municipality of Baclayon. According to the 2015 census, it has a population of 1,418, comprising about 240 families whose main livelihoods now concentrate on dolphin- and whale-watching tours and subsistence fishing, but in the past also included whale, dolphin and manta ray hunting.

Pamilacan perhaps means "resting place of the mantas", but it can also be considered to derive from the word pamilac, or harpoon, a device that was historically used to capture the mantas, dolphins and whales.

On the northeast part of the island is a 200yearold Spanish fort, which in the past served as a watchtower for the Spaniards to look out for intruders, such as pirates and other enemies, particularly those coming from the south. Along with the other watchtowers in Dauis, Panglao, Maribojoc, Loay and Balilihan, the island's watchtower was declared by the National Museum of the Philippines as a National Cultural Treasure under the collective group of Bohol Watchtowers on August 29, 2011

It is covered with coral but lies in the middle of the ocean, which is why there usually is a very strong current. Here one can see black-white banded sea snakes, sea turtles, moray eels, nudibranchs and bucket sponges.

References 

Islands of Bohol